Georges Creek is a stream in the U.S. state of Ohio. It is a tributary of Ohio Brush Creek.

Georges Creek was named for the local George family of pioneer settlers.

See also
List of rivers of Ohio

References

Rivers of Adams County, Ohio
Rivers of Ohio